John Henderson is an English film and television director (born in England, 1949)

After leaving advertising, Henderson's first directing job was for Spitting Image on ITV, which won him a BAFTA nomination. Henderson's other television credits include the multi award-winning double series The Borrowers, winner of two BAFTAs, the 1999 Comic Relief Doctor Who skit The Curse of Fatal Death (no credit was given to him upon broadcast however he was credited and interviewed when the story was released on VHS later that year);  two series of the comedy How Do You Want Me? starring Dylan Moran two series of the BBC's Sci-fi comedy Hyperdrive, Saxondale, Benidorm and Shameless amongst others. He has also directed several feature films including Loch Ness, Bring Me the Head of Mavis Davis, Two Men Went to War, and Mee-Shee: The Water Giant. He also co-wrote the family-based feature film, The Adventures of Greyfriars Bobby, released in 2005. Bring Me the Head of Mavis Davis was entered into the 20th Moscow International Film Festival. He directed the film Up All Night based on the CBBC show Friday Download.
He has over 250 credits as writer, producer or director in film and TV and his work has won some thirty international awards to date.

References

External links

1949 births
English film directors
English television directors
Living people
People educated at Haydon School